Fisk may refer to:

Places in the United States
Fisk, Iowa
Fisk, Missouri
Fisk, Wisconsin
Fisk University, Nashville, Tennessee
Fisk Generating Station, a fossil-fuel power station in Chicago, Illinois

Other uses
Fisk (surname)
Fisk Tire Company
Fria liberaler i Svenska kyrkan (FiSK), a nominating group in the Church of Sweden
Fisk (TV series), a 2021 Australian TV series

See also
Fiske
Fisker (disambiguation)
Justice Fisk (disambiguation)